Heraclides, Heracleides or Herakleides  in origin was any individual of the legendary clan of the Heracleidae, the mythological patronymic applying to persons descended from Hercules. As they were of the legendary tribe of the Dorians, the name in the classical age could mean anyone of Dorian background. The Dorians had their own group of dialects, which may or may not have been spoken by given individuals. Usage of the name was concentrated at Syracuse, a Dorian colony, Tarentum, a Spartan colony, and central Greece, legendary ancestral homeland of the Dorians, but they colonized the islands, Crete, and Anatolia as well. As a personal name, Heraclides may refer to:

Political or military leaders and related

At Syracuse
Several political leaders from ancient Syracuse, Sicily
 Heracleides, son of Lysimachus, a Syracusan general during the siege of Syracuse in the Peloponnesian War 415 BC
 Heracleides, 414 BC, another Syracusan general in the Peloponnesian War 414 BC
 Heracleides, son of Aristogenes, a Syracusan admiral in the Peloponnesian War 409 BC
 Heracleides (admiral), admiral under Dionysius II of Syracuse and populist leader of Syracuse c. 357-355 BC
 Heracleides, 317 BC, a Syracusan leader who sustained Sosistratus in 317 BC
 Heracleides, uncle of Agathocles, an uncle of Agathocles of Syracuse 
 Heracleides, 307 BC, the second son of Agathocles killed 307 BC

Elsewhere
 Heracleides Criticus, a Greek traveller of the 3rd century BC
 Heracleides of Leontini, a ruler or tyrant of Leontini 278 BC
 Heracleides of Mylasa, fl. 498 BC, a general from Mylasa, who commanded the Carian Greeks against the Persians 498 BC.
 Heracleides of Cyme, tyrant of Cyme in the 3rd century BC of uncertain name, usually accepted to be Heraclitus of Cyme
 Heraclides (son of Antiochus), general of Alexander the Great
 Heraclides (son of Argaeus), admiral of Alexander the Great
 Heracleides of Maroneia, a Greek in the service of the Thracian chief Seuthes c. 300 BC
 Heraclides, 290 BC, an officer of Demetrius Poliorcetes commanding the garrison of Athens
 Heracleides of Tarentum, an officer of Philip V of Macedon c. 213–199 BC
 Heracleides of Gyrton, a Thessalian cavalry commander in the army of Philip at the battle of Cynoscephalae
 Heracleides of Byzantium, an ambassador of Antiochus III the Great 190 BC
 Heracleides (ambassador), an envoy of Antiochus IV Epiphanes 169–162 BC
 Iacob Heraclid (1527–1563), soldier, Protestant missionary, and Prince of Moldavia

Religion
 Saint Heraclides (died 202 AD), Egyptian Christian martyr

Philosophy
 Heraclides of Tarentum  (fl. 3rd – 2nd century BC) a Pyrrhonist philosopher and physician of the Empiric school
 Heraclides Ponticus (390–310 BC), philosopher and astronomer who suggested heliocentrism
 Heraclides of Aenus, one of Plato's students, with his brother Python in 358 BC he assassinated Cotys, king of Thrace
 Heraclides Lembus, a philosopher

Literature
 Heracleides of Cyme fl. 350 BC, a little-attested historian
 Heracleides of Magnesia, author of a lost history of Mithridates VI of Pontus
 Heracleides of Odessus, a Greek historian mentioned by Stephanus Byzantinus
 Heraclides Ponticus the Younger, 1st century, Greek scholar who studied in Alexandria and worked in Rome (large passages from his works were published by Porphyry)
 Heracleides (rhetor), or Heracleides of Lycia, a Greek rhetorician of Lycia from the second century of our era. He was a disciple of Herodes Atticus, and taught in Athens and Smyrna
 Heracleides of Alexandria, Greek grammarian
 Heracleides of Sinope, a poet with one epigram in The Greek Anthology

Fine arts
 Heraclides (painter) a Macedonian painter of ships and encaustic, c. 168 BC
 Heracleides (architect), an architect
 Heracleides of Ephesus, a sculptor, son of Agasias
 Heracleides the Phocian, a sculptor from Phocis

Physicians
Several ancient physicians were named Heraclides:
 Heraclides (physician), son of Hippocrates I, married to Phaeniarete (or Praxithea), father of Sosander and Hippocrates II
 Heracleides Tarentinus, c. 2nd century BC, a physician of the Empiric school
 Heraclides of Erythrae 1st century BC, a physician of Erythrae in Ionia
 Heraclides of Smyrna 1st century BC, a follower of Hicesius, head of the Erasistratean school of medicine at Smyrna

Other uses
Heraclides, a grouping of swallowtail butterflies within the genus Papilio